E. Remington and Sons (1816–1896) was a manufacturer of firearms and typewriters. Founded in 1816 by Eliphalet Remington in Ilion, New York, on March 1, 1873, it became known for manufacturing the first commercial typewriter.

History

The rifle barrel
There are two versions of the origin story of the first Remington rifle barrel. One holds that the younger Remington wanted to purchase a rifle and lacked the money to buy one, so he made his own. The other states that he forged a barrel from wrought iron to see if he could build a better rifle than he could buy. Both versions have him taking the barrel to a gunsmith to have it rifled.

Eliphalet II forged his first rifle barrel as a young blacksmith in 1816 and finished second place in a local shooting match with it. Despite not winning the match, he proceeded to make barrels to meet the growing demand for flintlock rifles in the Mohawk Valley. With the completion of the Erie Canal, connecting Buffalo with Albany, commerce in the Mohawk Valley expanded remarkably, as did the demand for rifle barrels.

To meet the increased demand for rifle barrels, in 1828 the Remingtons moved their forge and foundry from its rural setting to 100 acres (0.4 km²) of land they had purchased astride the canal and abutting the Mohawk River near a town then called Morgan's Landing (later Ilion), New York.  The move coincided with the elder Eliphalet's death, and Eliphalet II assumed control of the business.

Becoming "E. Remington & Sons"
In 1839 Eliphalet was joined by his oldest son, Philo Remington (to make the business "E. Remington & Son"); in 1845, his second son, Samuel, also joined the company, afterward called "E. Remington & Sons". Remington's third son, Eliphalet III, would later join the company as well. During this period, the Remingtons specialized almost exclusively in manufacturing rifle barrels. These barrels, marked with the distinctive "REMINGTON" stamp near their breeches, were recognized for their quality and reasonable price. Many, if not most, of the independent gunsmiths in the Mohawk Valley purchased completed (but not rifled) barrels from Remington and assembled them into firearms custom ordered by their customers. As demand increased, the Remingtons added other parts to their inventory, first percussion locks made in Birmingham, England but marked with their stamp "REMINGTON", and later sets of brass gun furniture, including trigger guards, butt plates, and patch boxes. After 1846, martial longarm and then revolver production dominated the company's workforce.

In 1848, the company purchased gun-making machinery from the Ames Manufacturing Company of Chicopee, Massachusetts and took over a contract for Jenks breechloading percussion carbines for the U.S. Navy. Remington supplied the U.S. Navy with its first breech-loading rifle. Remington supplied the U.S. Army with rifles in the Mexican–American War (1846 to 1848). Shortly after, Remington took over a defaulted contract (by John Griffith of Cincinnati) for 5,000 U.S. Model 1841 Percussion Mississippi rifles. Based on the success of filling these orders, subsequent contracts followed in the 1850s.

In 1856 the company expanded to manufacturing agricultural implements. Upon Eliphalet's death in 1861, his son, Philo, took over the firm during the Civil War and diversified the product line to include sewing machines (manufactured from 1870 to 1894) and typewriters (1873), both of which were exhibited at the Centennial Exposition in Philadelphia in 1876.

Remington's typewriter 

On June 23, 1868, a patent was granted to Christopher Sholes, Carlos Glidden, and Samuel W. Soule for a "Type-Writer" which was eventually developed into the Sholes and Glidden typewriter, the first device that allowed an operator to type substantially faster than a person could write by hand. The patent (U.S. 79,265) was sold for $12,000 to Densmore and Yost, who agreed with E. Remington and Sons (then famous as a manufacturer of sewing machines) to commercialize what was known as the Sholes and Glidden Type-Writer. Remington started production of their first typewriter on March 1, 1873, in Ilion, New York.
The Type-Writer introduced the QWERTY, designed by Sholes, and the success of the follow-up Remington No. 2 of 1878 – the first typewriter to include both upper and lower case letters via a shift key – led to the popularity of the QWERTY layout.

Successor companies

Remington Arms

E. Remington & Sons supplied a large proportion of the small arms used by the United States government in the Civil War (1861 to 1865). On March 7, 1888, ownership of E. Remington & Sons left possession of the Remington family and was sold to new owners Hartley and Graham of New York, New York, and the Winchester Repeating Arms Company of New Haven, Connecticut, at which time the name was formally changed to the Remington Arms Company.

Remington, in addition, was one of the most successful gun manufacturers in the world arms trade between 1867 and 1900, specifically through the export of the Remington Rolling Block action rifle. This single-shot, large-caliber black-powder cartridge rifle was exported in the millions all over the world, including shipments to France, Egypt, Denmark, Norway, Sweden, Belgium, Argentina, Mexico, and the Papal States. It was a critical gun supplier of small arms used by the United States government in World War I (U.S. involvement 1917 to 1918) and World War II (U.S. involvement 1941 to 1945)

Remington Typewriter Company

In 1886, E. Remington and Sons sold its typewriter business to the Standard Typewriter Manufacturing Company, Inc. Included were the rights to use the Remington name. The buyers were William O. Wyckoff, Harry H. Benedict, and Clarence Seamans, all of whom worked for Remington.

Standard Typewriter changed its name in 1902 to Remington Typewriter Company. This company merged in 1927 with Rand Kardex Bureau to form Remington Rand, which continued to manufacture office equipment and later became a major computer company, as well as manufacturing electric razors.

References

Notes

Bibliography

 Beeching, Wilfred A. (1974). Century of the Typewriter. New York: St. Martin's Press.

External links 

Firearm manufacturers of the United States
Typewriters
Manufacturing companies established in 1816
New York (state) in the American Civil War
Defunct firearms manufacturers
Herkimer County, New York
Defunct manufacturing companies based in New York (state)
Former components of the Dow Jones Industrial Average
1816 establishments in New York (state)
American companies disestablished in 1896
American companies established in 1816
1896 disestablishments in New York (state)
Manufacturing companies disestablished in 1896